Nikolaj Sørensen (born February 18, 1989) is a Danish-Canadian ice dancer. Competing for Canada with his skating partner, Laurence Fournier Beaudry, he is the 2023 Four Continents silver medalist, a six-time Grand Prix medallist (including gold at the 2022 NHK Trophy), a five-time Challenger medallist (including gold at the 2019 CS Nebelhorn Trophy and 2022 CS Finlandia Trophy), and the 2023 Canadian national champion. Fournier Beaudry and Sørensen represented Canada at the 2022 Winter Olympics.

Fournier Beaudry and Sørensen previously competed for Denmark, winning six ISU Challenger Series medals and representing Denmark at the World and European championships. In March 2018, Denmark released them to compete for Canada after Laurence was unable to obtain Danish citizenship to compete at the 2018 Winter Olympics.

Early career 
Sørensen began learning to skate in 1996 at his father's instigation. He competed internationally with Anne Thomsen beginning in 2003. They placed twenty-fourth at the 2006 World Junior Championships.

In 2007, Sørensen teamed up with Czech skater Barbora Heroldová to compete for Denmark. They competed one season together, placing twenty-first at the 2008 World Junior Championships.

In 2009, Sørensen began competing with Canadian skater Katelyn Good for Denmark. In their first season together, they won the Danish senior national title, placed seventeenth at 2010 World Junior Championships, twenty-first at the 2010 European Championships, and twenty-fourth at the 2010 World Championships. The following season, they decided to move from training in the United States under Mathew Gates to Montreal to be near Good's mother.  On Gates' recommendation, they began training under Marie-France Dubreuil and Patrice Lauzon, whose just-opened ice dance academy had only four teams at the time.  Shortly after the move, Good's mother died.  Sørensen and Good placed twenty-ninth at the 2011 World Championships in their final performance together, as Good chose to retire due to injury.

In 2012, Sørensen began skating with Canadian skater Vanessa Crone, but she decided not to compete with him.

Partnership with Fournier Beaudry 
Sørensen had a tryout with another Canadian, Laurence Fournier Beaudry of Quebec, in February 2012. He decided to team up with Crone but called Fournier Beaudry five months later, shortly after Crone's decision not to compete with him.  Fournier Beaudry and Sørensen decided to represent Denmark while continuing to train in Canada under Dubreuil and Lauzon.

2013–2014 season 
Making their international competition debut in the fall of 2013, they won gold at the 2013 Pavel Roman Memorial, silver at the 2013 Ice Challenge, and bronze at the Toruń Cup.  At the 2014 Danish Championships, they were the only competitors in ice dance.

In their ISU Championship debut, they placed thirteenth at the 2014 European Championships and concluded the season placing twenty-ninth at the 2014 World Championships in Saitama.

2014–2015 season 
The duo competed in three ISU Challenger Series events at the beginning of the season, placing fourth at the Volvo Open Cup, repeating as silver medallists at the Ice Challenge, and earning a bronze medal at the 2014 Autumn Classic.  They were again the only competitors at the Danish Championships' ice dance event.

They placed ninth at their second European Championships.  At the 2015 World Championships in Shanghai, they placed eleventh.

2015–2016 season 
Beginning the season again on the Challenger Series, Fournier Beaudry and Sørensen won the silver medal at the 2015 U.S. International Classic and the bronze medal at the Finlandia Trophy.  Making their Grand Prix debut, they placed seventh at the 2015 Skate Canada International.

Fournier Beaudry and Sørensen placed ninth at Europeans for the second consecutive year and finished with a thirteenth-place finish at the 2016 World Championships in Boston.

2016–2017 season 
On the Challenger Series, Fournier Beaudry and Sørensen won their second bronze medal at the Autumn Classic International, and placed fourth at the Finlandia Trophy.  Given two Grand Prix assignments, they placed seventh at both Skate Canada International and the Rostelecom Cup.

The duo placed seventh at Europeans.  They went on to place thirteenth at the 2017 World Championships in Helsinki, Finland. Due to their result, Denmark qualified a spot in the ice dancing event at the 2018 Winter Olympics in Pyeongchang, South Korea.

2017–2018 season 
They took part in three Challenger Series events, placing fourth at the 2015 U.S. International Classic, seventh at the Autumn Classic International, and winning a second bronze medal at the Finlandia Trophy.  At their sole Grand Prix event for the season, the 2017 NHK Trophy, Fournier Beaudry and Sørensen placed fifth.  Appearing at their third and final Danish Championships, they were again the only competitors in senior ice dance.
 
Fournier Beaudry's citizenship status had dogged the team for much of the preceding years, as Danish law required seven years' residency for naturalization, and ultimately no allowance could be made.  As a result, they could not participate in the Olympics despite having qualified for a spot there.  Following the 2018 European Championships, where they placed ninth, the two reassessed their options and decided to switch countries and compete for Canada.  In March 2018, Denmark released them for that purpose.  Speaking of the challenges later, Sørensen remarked that they had been welcomed by the Canadian federation and that the Danish federation had always been supportive of his years of training in Canada had already made him as much Canadian as Danish and stated that he hoped to acquire Canadian citizenship by 2020.

2018–2019 season 
Fournier Beaudry chose Adiós Nonino for the rhythm dance, creating a cut of different instrumental and lyrical versions.  She and Sørensen opted to retain their free program from the previous season, revised for the ISU's new rules.  Sørensen remarked that it "is a transitional year with a lot of new feelings and a lot of new challenges, so it was natural to keep something familiar around."  ISU rules required that a team switching countries sit out international competition for a year from their last international appearance, meaning they were ineligible for the Challenger and Grand Prix series.

In their first competition of the season, the 2019 Skate Canada Challenge, the duo placed first in both programs, qualifying for the 2019 Canadian Championships. At the Canadian Championships, they placed third and were named to the team for the 2019 Four Continents Championships and 2019 World Championships.  They placed sixth at Four Continents, and tenth at the World Championships.

2019–2020 season 
Fournier Beaudry/Sørensen won the silver medal for their first event of the season at the Lombardia Trophy.  They followed this with a gold medal at the Nebelhorn Trophy, their first Challenger title, increasing their personal best score by over ten points.  Returning to the Grand Prix after a season away, they placed third in the rhythm dance at the 2019 Skate America, becoming one of the first teams to earn a perfect Level 4 on the Finnstep pattern dance.  They also placed third in the free dance, winning the bronze medal.  Sørensen called their first Grand Prix medal "something that we've dreamed about since we started skating together." At their second event, the 2019 Cup of China, they were again third in the rhythm dance and the only team at the event to earn a Level 4 on the Finnstep. Third as well in the free dance, despite some minor issues resulting in a lower score than at previous events, they won their second Grand Prix bronze. Sørensen explained afterwards that a knee injury had caused him to miss a week of training in between events.

Fournier Beaudry/Sørensen did not compete at the 2020 Canadian Championships due to the latter undergoing a cartilage graft and a meniscectomy to repair his knee.  On February 13, 2020, Skate Canada announced that they had been assigned to compete at the 2020 World Championships.  On March 6, 2020, they withdrew from the World Championships due to Sørensen's incomplete recovery; the championships themselves were cancelled five days later.

2020–2021 season 
Fournier Beaudry/Sørensen were assigned to the 2020 Skate Canada International, but the event was cancelled as a result of the coronavirus pandemic.

With the pandemic continuing to make in-person competitions difficult, Fournier Beaudry/Sørensen competed at virtual domestic competitions, winning the Quebec Sectionals and then taking the silver medal at the 2021 Skate Canada Challenge.  The 2021 Canadian Championships were subsequently cancelled.

On February 25, Fournier Beaudry and Sørenson were announced as part of the Canadian team to the 2021 World Championships in Stockholm.  They placed seventh in the rhythm dance despite getting only one of the four key points on the Finnstep pattern. In the free dance, they dropped to eighth place behind the British team Fear/Gibson by 0.04 points. Sørenson acknowledged afterwards having "left a couple of points on the table." Their placement combined with Gilles/Poirier's bronze medal win qualified three berths for Canadian dance teams at the 2022 Winter Olympics.

2021–2022 season 
The team began the season at the 2021 CS Lombardia Trophy, winning the silver medal for the second time. Sørenson commented afterwards that it was "not the best free dance today" following twizzle errors from both, but that "we are just going to build from here." Going onto their first Grand Prix assignment of the year, 2021 Skate America, they placed third in the rhythm dance. Fourth in the free dance, dropping behind Spaniards Smart/Díaz in that segment, they remained in the bronze medal position overall by 0.44 points. Reflecting on "our third grand prix for Canada with a bronze medal", Fournier Beaudry called it "so nice to be back after two years of struggle and feeling like the machine is rolling and the bodies are rolling again." After winning another Challenger silver at the 2021 CS Cup of Austria, the following week, they won another bronze medal at their second Grand Prix assignment, the 2021 Rostelecom Cup.

At the 2022 Canadian Championships, held without an audience in Ottawa due to the pandemic, Fournier Beaudry/Sørenson placed second in both segments of the competition to take the silver medal. They debuted a new free dance rechoreographed to Hans Zimmer and Lisa Gerrard's score to Gladiator, a decision made three weeks prior. Sørenson said the original program "was an idea we came up with when we were off the ice, and we were trying to navigate the beginning of this pandemic. So you know, feelings change, and what we thought we needed changed during this season." The following day, they were named to the Canadian Olympic team. Speaking on the occasion to Danish TV 2, Sørenson reflected "it's a shame that we could not compete for Denmark, because we have never been to the Olympics in ice dancing. I often think the small countries are underrepresented in a sport like ice dancing."

Competing at the dance event at the 2022 Winter Olympics, Fournier Beaudry/Sørenson placed eighth in the rhythm dance. A twizzle error by Sørenson caused them to place eleventh in the free dance, dropping them to ninth overall. They went on to finish the season at the 2022 World Championships in Montpellier, held with the Russian dance teams absent due to the International Skating Union banning all Russian athletes due to their country's invasion of Ukraine. Sørenson struggled with a back injury during the competition, which caused problems in the free dance when their closing lift was aborted, dropping them from eighth to ninth place. He said, "it's unfortunate, but it happens."

2022–2023 season 
For their free dance in the new season, Fournier Beaudry and Sørenson conceived of a program utilizing two styles of flamenco, inspired by pieces of Ennio Morricone's music used in the soundtrack for Kill Bill. The idea was said to have come to their coach, Marie-France Dubreuil, in the process of doing her laundry. They opened the season with a win at the 2022 CS Finlandia Trophy, their second ever Challenger gold medal. Sørenson said that their focus in training had been on "redeeming ourselves after how we finished last season," calling this a positive step in that direction. They set new personal bests at the event, breaking the 120-point mark in the free dance for the first time.

On the Grand Prix, the team was first assigned to the 2022 Grand Prix de France, where they won the silver medal, their first of that colour on the circuit. They set a new personal best in the rhythm dance for the second consecutive event. Fournier Beaudry said that "we have high aspirations, and we want to go to the Grand Prix Final, so we are one step closer to our goal for this season." The team's second event was the 2022 NHK Trophy in Sapporo, where they went in considered likely to repeat their silver medal result. However, they finished first in the rhythm dance with a new personal best score of 85.66, 0.66 points ahead of pre-event favourites and training partners Chock/Bates of the United States. They won the free dance as well, setting another set of personal bests, to take the gold medal over Chock/Bates and qualify for the Grand Prix Final. Fournier Beaudry called it "a dream come true and something we have worked for for a very long time," while Sørenson added, "thinking back and getting to where we are right now is just amazing."

Fournier Beaudry/Sørenson finished fourth in the rhythm dance at the Grand Prix Final in Turin, 1.39 points back of third-place Guignard/Fabbri of Italy. However, they made a major error in the free dance, falling out of their curve in the process of altering the position, resulting in the element being graded at only base level and two points lost in fall deductions. They finished sixth of six teams in that segment and dropped narrowly to sixth overall. Sørenson attributed the mistake to "lack of concentration."

With reigning Canadian national (and Grand Prix Final) champions Gilles/Poirier absent from the 2023 Canadian Championships due to Gilles requiring an appendectomy, Fournier Beaudry/Sørenson entered the event as the title favourites. They finished first in the rhythm dance despite a twizzle error from Sørenson, 2.15 points ahead of training partners Lajoie/Lagha. In the free dance, Fournier Beaudry tripped on her skirt in the midst of their choreographic slide move at the end of the program, costing them that element. They finished second in the free dance, but remained first overall by 0.60 points and won the gold medal. He called the championships "a really good time," despite the error.

Fournier Beaudry/Sørenson were the top Canadian dance team assigned to the 2023 Four Continents Championships, with Gilles/Poirier still absent. Fournier Beaudry sustained an MCL tear the week before the event, but with careful management they were able to attend the event. They placed second in the rhythm dance with a personal best 86.28, unexpectedly close to Chock/Bates in first with 87.67. In the free dance they set another new personal best of 127.80, finishing second in that segment as well and winning the silver medal. Sørenson said they were "so pleased winning our first championship medal of our entire career. It is our eleventh year skating together."

Programs 
(with Fournier Beaudry)

With Good

With Heroldová

With Thomsen

Competitive highlights 
GP: Grand Prix; CS: Challenger Series; JGP: Junior Grand Prix

With Fournier Beaudry

For Canada

For Denmark

With Good

With Heroldová

With Thomsen

Detailed results

With Fournier Beaudry for Canada
Small medals for short and free programs awarded only at ISU Championships. At team events, medals awarded for team results only.  Current ISU personal bests highlighted in bold.

References

External links 

 
 
 
 

1989 births
Living people
Sportspeople from Copenhagen
Canadian male ice dancers
Danish ice dancers
Danish male dancers
21st-century Danish dancers
Danish expatriate sportspeople in Canada
Danish emigrants to Canada
Figure skaters at the 2022 Winter Olympics
Olympic figure skaters of Canada
Four Continents Figure Skating Championships medalists